The Capitanian mass extinction event, also known as the end-Guadalupian extinction event, the Guadalupian-Lopingian boundary mass extinction, or the pre-Lopingian crisis was an extinction event that predated the end-Permian extinction event. The mass extinction occurred during a period of decreased species richness and increased extinction rates near the end of the Middle Permian, also known as the Guadalupian epoch. It is often called the end-Guadalupian extinction event because of its initial recognition between the Guadalupian and Lopingian series; however, more refined stratigraphic study suggests that extinction peaks in many taxonomic groups occurred within the Guadalupian, in the latter half of the Capitanian age. The extinction event began around 262 million years ago with the Late Guadalupian crisis, though its most intense pulse occurred 259 million years ago in what is known as the Guadalupian-Lopingian boundary event.

Having not traditionally been considered among the "Big Five" mass extinctions and having only been recognised relatively recently, this mass extinction is believed to be the third largest of the Phanerozoic in terms of the percentage of species lost, after the end-Permian and Late Ordovician mass extinctions, respectively, while being the fifth worst in terms of ecological severity. The global nature of the Capitanian mass extinction has been called into question by some palaeontologists as a result of some analyses finding it to have only affected low-latitude taxa in the Northern Hemisphere.

Magnitude 

In the aftermath of Olson's Extinction, global diversity rose during the Capitanian. This was probably the result of disaster taxa replacing extinct guilds. The Capitanian mass extinction greatly reduced disparity (the range of different guilds); eight guilds were lost. It impacted the diversity within individual communities more severely than the Permian–Triassic extinction event. Although faunas began recovery immediately after the Capitanian extinction event, rebuilding complex trophic structures and refilling guilds, diversity and disparity fell further until the  boundary.

Marine ecosystems 

The impact of the Capitanian extinction event on marine ecosystems is still heavily debated by palaeontologists. Early estimates indicated a loss of marine invertebrate genera between 35 and 47%, while an estimate published in 2016 suggested a loss of 33–35% of marine genera when corrected for background extinction, the Signor–Lipps effect and clustering of extinctions in certain taxa. The loss of marine invertebrates during the Capitanian mass extinction was comparable in magnitude to the Cretaceous–Paleogene extinction event. Some studies have considered it the third or fourth greatest mass extinction in terms of the proportion of marine invertebrate genera lost; a different study found the Capitanian extinction event to be only the ninth worst in terms of taxonomic severity (number of genera lost) but found it to be the fifth worst with regard to its ecological impact (i.e., the degree of taxonomic restructuring within ecosystems or the loss of ecological niches or even entire ecosystems themselves).

Terrestrial ecosystems 

Few published estimates for the impact on terrestrial ecosystems exist for the Capitanian mass extinction. Among vertebrates, Day and colleagues suggested a 74–80% loss of generic richness in tetrapods of the Karoo Basin in South Africa, including the extinction of the dinocephalians. In land plants, Stevens and colleagues found an extinction of 56% of plant species recorded in the mid-Upper Shihhotse Formation in North China, which was approximately mid-Capitanian in age. 24% of plant species in South China went extinct.

Timing 
Although it is known that the Capitanian mass extinction occurred after Olson's Extinction and before the Permian–Triassic extinction event, the exact age of the Capitanian mass extinction remains controversial. This is partly due to the somewhat circumstantial age of the Capitanian–Wuchiapingian boundary itself, which is currently estimated to be approximately 259.1 million years old, but is subject to change by the Subcommission on Permian Stratigraphy of the International Commission on Stratigraphy. Additionally, there is a dispute regarding the severity of the extinction and whether the extinction in China happened at the same time as the extinction in Spitsbergen.

The volcanics of the Emeishan Traps, which are interbedded with tropical carbonate platforms of the Maokou Formation, are unique for preserving a mass extinction and the cause of that mass extinction. Large phreatomagmatic eruptions occurred when the Emeishan Traps first started to erupt, leading to the extinction of fusulinacean foraminifera and calcareous algae.

In the absence of radiometric ages directly constraining the extinction horizons themselves in the marine sections, most recent studies refrain from placing a number on its age, but based on extrapolations from the Permian timescale an age of approximately 260–262 Ma has been estimated; this fits broadly with radiometric ages from the terrestrial realm, assuming the two events are contemporaneous. Plant losses occurred either at the same time as the marine extinction or after it.

Marine realm 
The extinction of fusulinacean foraminifera in Southwest China was originally dated to the end of the Guadalupian, but studies published in 2009 and 2010 dated the extinction of these fusulinaceans to the mid-Capitanian. Brachiopod and coral losses occurred in the middle of the Capitanian stage. The extinction suffered by the ammonoids may have occurred in the early Wuchiapingian.

Terrestrial realm 
The existence of change in tetrapod faunas in the mid-Permian has long been known in South Africa and Russia. In Russia, it corresponded to the boundary between what became known as the Titanophoneus Superzone and the Scutosaurus Superzone and later the Dinocephalian Superassemblage and the Theriodontian Superassemblage, respectively. In South Africa, this corresponded to the boundary between the variously named Pareiasaurus, Dinocephalian or Tapinocephalus Assemblage Zone and the overlying assemblages. In both Russia and South Africa, this transition was associated with the extinction of the previously dominant group of therapsid amniotes, the dinocephalians, which led to its later designation as the dinocephalian extinction. Post-extinction origination rates remained low through the Pristerognathus Assemblage Zone for at least 1 million years, which suggests that there was a delayed recovery of Karoo Basin ecosystems.

After the recognition of a separate marine mass extinction at the end of the Guadalupian, the dinocephalian extinction was seen to represent its terrestrial correlate. Though it was subsequently suggested that because the Russian Ischeevo fauna, which was considered the youngest dinocephalian fauna in that region, was constrained to below the Illawarra magnetic reversal and therefore had to have occurred in the Wordian stage, well before the end of the Guadalupian, this constraint applied to the type locality only. The recognition of a younger dinocephalian fauna in Russia (the Sundyr Tetrapod Assemblage) and the retrieval of biostratigraphically  radiometric ages via uranium–lead dating of a tuff from the Tapinocephalus Assemblage Zone of the Karoo Basin demonstrated that the dinocephalian extinction did occur in the late Capitanian, around 260 million years ago.

Effects on life

Marine life 

In the oceans, the Capitanian extinction event led to high extinction rates among ammonoids, corals and calcareous algal reef-building organisms, foraminiferans, bryozoans and brachiopods. It appears to have been particularly selective against shallow-water taxa that relied on photosynthesis or a photosymbiotic relationship; many species with poorly buffered respiratory physiologies also became extinct. The extinction event led to a collapse of the reef carbonate factory in the shallow seas surrounding South China.

The ammonoids, which had been in a long-term decline for a 30 million year period since the Roadian, suffered a selective extinction pulse at the end of the Capitanian. 75.6% of coral families, 77.8% of coral genera and 82.2% of coral species that were in Permian China were lost during the Capitanian mass extinction. The Verbeekinidae, a family of large fusuline foraminifera, went extinct.

87% of brachiopod species found at the Kapp Starostin Formation on Spitsbergen disappeared over a period of tens of thousands of years; though new brachiopod and bivalve species emerged after the extinction, the dominant position of the brachiopods was taken over by the bivalves. Approximately 70% of other species found at the Kapp Starostin Formation also vanished. The fossil record of East Greenland is similar to that of Spitsbergen; the faunal losses in Canada's Sverdrup Basin are comparable to the extinctions in Spitsbergen and East Greenland, but the post-extinction recovery that happened in Spitsbergen and East Greenland did not occur in the Sverdrup Basin. Whereas rhynchonelliform brachiopods made up 99.1% of the individuals found in tropical carbonates in the Western United States, South China and Greece prior to the extinction, molluscs made up 61.2% of the individuals found in similar environments after the extinction. 87% of brachiopod species and 82% of fusulinacean foraminifer species in South China were lost.

Biomarker evidence indicates red algae and photoautotrophic bacteria dominated marine microbial communities. Significant turnovers in microbial ecosystems occurred during the Capitanian mass extinction, though they were smaller in magnitude than those associated with the end-Permian extinction.

Most of the marine victims of the extinction were either endemic species of epicontinental seas around Pangaea that died when the seas closed, or were dominant species of the Paleotethys Ocean. Evidence from marine deposits in Japan and Primorye suggests that mid-latitude marine life became affected earlier by the extinction event than marine organisms of the tropics.

This mass extinction marked the beginning of the transition between the Palaeozoic and Modern evolutionary faunas. The brachiopod-mollusc transition that characterised the broader shift from the Palaeozoic to Modern evolutionary faunas has been suggested to have had its roots in the Capitanian mass extinction event, although other research has concluded that this may be an illusion created by taphonomic bias in silicified fossil assemblages, with the transition only beginning in the aftermath of the more cataclysmic end-Permian extinction. After the Capitanian mass extinction, disaster taxa such as Earlandia and Diplosphaerina became abundant in what is now South China. The initial recovery of reefs consisted of non-metazoan reefs: algal bioherms and algal-sponge reef buildups. This initial recovery interval was followed by an interval of Tubiphytes-dominated reefs, which in turn was followed by a return of metazoan, sponge-dominated reefs. Overall, reef recovery took approximately 2.5 million years.

Terrestrial life 

Among terrestrial vertebrates, the main victims were dinocephalian therapsids, which were one of the most common elements of tetrapod fauna of the Guadalupian; only one dinocephalian genus survived the Capitanian extinction event. The diversity of the anomodonts that lived during the late Guadalupian was cut in half by the Capitanian mass extinction.

Causes

Emeishan Traps

Volcanic emissions 
It is believed that the extinction, which coincided with the beginning of a major negative δ13C excursion signifying a severe disturbance of the carbon cycle, was triggered by eruptions of the Emeishan Traps large igneous province, basalt piles from which currently cover an area of 250,000 to 500,000 km2, although the original volume of the basalts may have been anywhere from 500,000 km3 to over 1,000,000 km3. Reefs and other marine sediments interbedded among basalt piles indicate Emeishan volcanism initially developed underwater; terrestrial outflows of lava only occurred later in the large igneous province's period of activity. These eruptions would have released high doses of toxic mercury. A large amount of carbon dioxide and sulphur dioxide is believed to have been discharged into the stratosphere of the Northern and Southern Hemispheres due to the equatorial location of the Emeishan Traps, leading to sudden global cooling and  global warming. The Emeishan Traps discharged between 130 and 188 teratonnes of carbon dioxide in total, doing so at a rate of between 0.08 to 0.25 gigatonnes of carbon dioxide per year, making them responsible for an increase in atmospheric carbon dioxide that was both one of the largest and one of the most precipitous in the entire geological history of the Earth. The rate of carbon dioxide emissions during the Capitanian mass extinction, though extremely abrupt, was nonetheless significantly slower than that during the end-Permian extinction, during which carbon dioxide levels rose five times faster according to one study. Significant quantities of methane released by dikes and sills intruding into coal-rich deposits has been implicated as an additional driver of warming, though this idea has been challenged by studies that instead conclude that the extinction was precipitated directly by the Emeishan Traps or by their interaction with platform carbonates.

Anoxia and euxinia 

Global warming resulting from the large igneous province's activity has been implicated as a cause of a major marine anoxic event and of increased continental weathering and mineral erosion, which in turn has been propounded as a factor enhancing oceanic euxinia. Euxinia may have been exacerbated even further by the increasing sluggishness of ocean circulation resulting from volcanically driven warming. The initial hydrothermal nature of the Emeishan Traps meant that local marine life around South China would have been especially jeopardised by anoxia due to hyaloclastite development in restricted, fault-bounded basins. Expansion of oceanic anoxia has been posited to have occurred slightly before the Capitanian extinction event itself by some studies, though it is probable that upwelling of anoxic waters prior to the mass extinction was a local phenomenon specific to South China.

Hypercapnia and acidification 

Because the ocean acts as a carbon sink absorbing atmospheric carbon dioxide, it is likely that the excessive volcanic emissions of carbon dioxide resulted in marine hypercapnia, which would have acted in conjunction with other killing mechanisms to further increase the severity of the biotic crisis. The dissolution of volcanically emitted carbon dioxide in the oceans triggered ocean acidification, which probably contributed to the demise of various calcareous marine organisms, particularly giant alatoconchid bivalves. Furthermore, acid rain would have arisen as yet another biocidal consequence of the intense sulphur emissions produced by Emeishan Traps volcanism. This resulted in soil acidification and a decline of terrestrial infaunal invertebrates. Some researchers have cast doubt on whether significant acidification took place globally, concluding that the carbon cycle perturbation was too small to have caused a major worldwide drop in pH.

Criticism of the volcanic cause hypothesis 

Not all studies, however, have supported the volcanic warming hypothesis; analysis of δ13C and δ18O values from the tooth apatite of Diictodon feliceps specimens from the Karoo Supergroup shows a positive δ13C excursion and concludes that the end of the Capitanian was marked by massive aridification in the region, although the temperature remained largely the same, suggesting that global climate change did not account for the extinction event. Analysis of vertebrate extinction rates in the Karoo Basin, specifically the upper Abrahamskraal Formation and lower Teekloof Formation, show that the large scale decrease in terrestrial vertebrate diversity coincided with volcanism in the Emeishan Traps, although robust evidence for a causal relationship between these two events remains elusive. A 2015 study called into question whether the Capitanian mass extinction event was global in nature at all or merely a regional biotic crisis limited to South China and a few other areas, finding no evidence for terrestrial or marine extinctions in eastern Australia linked to the Emeishan Traps or to any proposed extinction triggers invoked to explain the biodiversity drop in low-latitudes of the Northern Hemisphere.

Sea level fall 

The Capitanian mass extinction has been attributed to sea level fall, with the widespread demise of reefs in particular being linked to this marine regression. The Guadalupian-Lopingian boundary coincided with one of the most prominent first-order marine regressions of the Phanerozoic. Evidence for abrupt sea level fall at the terminus of the Guadalupian comes from evaporites and terrestrial facies overlying marine carbonate deposits across the Guadalupian-Lopingian transition. Additionally, a tremendous unconformity is associated with the Guadalupian-Lopingian boundary in many strata across the world.

Other hypotheses 

Global drying, plate tectonics, and biological competition may have also played a role in the extinction. Potential drivers of extinction proposed as causes of end-Guadalupian reef decline include fluctuations in salinity and tectonic collisions of microcontinents.

References 

Extinction events
 
Guadalupian